Hold the Dream is a British two-part serial made in 1986, based on the 1985 novel of the same name by Barbara Taylor Bradford. It is the second book in the Emma Harte series, following A Woman of Substance. Hold the Dream continues the story of Emma Harte, played by Deborah Kerr, with Jenny Seagrove, who played the young Emma taking over the part of Paula Fairley.

Plot 

Paula Fairley, now head of the Harte chain of department stores, has taken on the burden of preserving Emma's legacy. However, she suffers dissent within her extended family, in particular from her devious cousin Jonathan Ainsley.

Her marriage to Jim Fairley is unhappy, leading her into the arms of her childhood sweetheart, Shane O'Neill (Stephen Collins), grandson of Blackie O'Neill (Liam Neeson). Struggling to prove herself in a male dominated world, just like her grandmother before her, Paula suffers heartache and loss that mirror the life of her grandmother. Emma's request that Paula hold her dream is what drives Paula to fight and overcome personal tragedy and come out on top, so as to save the Harte name for the next generation.

Cast 

 Jenny Seagrove as Paula Fairley
 Stephen Collins as Shane O'Neill
 Deborah Kerr as Emma Harte
 James Brolin as Ross Nelson
 Claire Bloom as Edwina, Lady Dunvale
 Paul Daneman as David Amory
 Fiona Fullerton as Skye Smith
 Suzanna Hamilton as Emily Barkstone
 Nigel Havers as Jim Fairley
 John Mills as Henry Rossiter
 Liam Neeson as Blackie O'Neill
 Pauline Yates as Daisy Amory
 Valentine Pelka as Winston Harte
 Sarah-Jane Varley as Sally Harte
 Paul Geoffrey as Anthony, Earl of Dunvale
 Dominic Jephcott as Jonathan Ainsley
 Victoria Wicks as Sarah Lowther
 David Swift as John Cross
 Nicholas Farrell as Sebastian Cross
 Richard Morant as Malcolm Perring
 Bruce Boa as Dale Stevens
 Denyse Alexander as Gaye Sloane
 Amanda Boxer as Minerva
 Kate Harper as Elaine Vickers
 Christopher Muncke as Sonny Vickers
 Ralph Watson as Sam Fellowes

Production
The script was written by Barbara Taylor Bradford herself after the producer had been unhappy with a number of other scripts. She had never written a script before.

Karl Lagerfeld designed 40 costumes for Jenny Seagrove to wear in this miniseries. The title song was written by Barrie Guard and performed by Elkie Brooks. The song was released on Brooks's 1986 album No More the Fool.

Reception
The New York Times, which had liked A Woman of Substance, called this "dreary" and "will no doubt be useful as a future textbook case on how not to make a sequel."

References

External links 
 

1980s British television miniseries
Channel 4 original programming
1986 British television series debuts
Films directed by Don Sharp
1986 British television series endings
1980s business films
Operation Prime Time
Television shows based on British novels
English-language television shows
Television shows set in the United Kingdom
Television shows set in the United States